James Howard Wood (born May 20, 1959) is an American former professional basketball player born in Southampton, New York.  A 6'7" 235 lb power forward, Wood played college basketball at the University of Tennessee and played one season in the National Basketball Association (NBA) with the Utah Jazz.

Howard Wood, a graduate of East Hampton High School, led the team to a state H.S. basketball championship in 1977.

During his years at Tennessee, he teamed future NBA players Reggie Johnson and Dale Ellis, and as a senior was a key player on the team's first ever NCAA Tournament Sweet Sixteen appearance in 1981, where they lost to top-seeded Virginia Cavaliers. Wood was named second team All-America in 1981 by Converse, and earned first team All-SEC honors as a senior in 1981. He was named the MVP of the 1980 Sugar Bowl Classic and the 1979 Volunteer Classic. He finished his career at Tennessee with 1,201 career points and 595 rebounds.

Wood was selected by the Utah Jazz with the 4th pick in the 2nd round of the 1981 NBA Draft. He averaged 3.4 points per game in 42 games for them in 1981-82 — his only NBA season, after which he played several years in Spain's premier leagues.

References

External links
NBA stats @ basketballreference.com
 https://web.archive.org/web/20150331181037/http://www.utsports.com/sports/m-baskbl/spec-rel/all-americans.html
 http://easthamptonstar.com/?q=Sports/2012530/High-School%E2%80%99s-Inaugural-Hall-Fame-Class

1959 births
Living people
American expatriate basketball people in Spain
American men's basketball players
Basketball players from New York (state)
Billings Volcanos players
Cantabria Baloncesto players
Club Ourense Baloncesto players
Liga ACB players
People from East Hampton (town), New York
People from Southampton (town), New York
Power forwards (basketball)
Sportspeople from Suffolk County, New York
Tennessee Volunteers basketball players
Utah Jazz draft picks
Utah Jazz players
Valencia Basket players
Wisconsin Flyers players
East Hampton High School alumni